Darguen (also romanized as Dargū’en; also known as Dargan, Dargon, and Dargoon) is a village in Gowharan Rural District, Gowharan District, Bashagard County, Hormozgan Province, Iran. At the 2006 census, its population was 196, in 40 families.

References 

Populated places in Bashagard County